Christer Jansson (born 1 October 1946) is a Swedish former sports shooter. He competed in two events at the 1972 Summer Olympics.

References

1946 births
Living people
Swedish male sport shooters
Olympic shooters of Sweden
Shooters at the 1972 Summer Olympics
Sport shooters from Stockholm